The Parks Football Centre or VALO Football Centre (for sponsorship reasons) is a football stadium in Angle Park, South Australia. The venue was built as only the second full size synthetic pitch in South Australia.

References

External links
 Soccerway website

Soccer venues in South Australia
Sports venues in Adelaide
Sports venues completed in 2014
2014 establishments in Australia